Nasir Abdel Karim al-Wuhayshi (also transliterated as Naser al-Wahishi, Nasser al-Wuhayshi) alias Abu Basir, (1 October 1976 – 12 June 2015) was a Yemeni Islamist, who served as the leader of al-Qaeda in the Arabian Peninsula (AQAP). Both Saudi Arabia and Yemen considered al-Wuhayshi to be among their most wanted fugitives. In  October 2014, the US State Department increased the reward for any information leading to the capture or killing of al-Wuhayshi to US$10 million, the same as ISIS leader Abu Bakr al-Baghdadi. Wuhayshi was killed in a US drone strike in Hadhramaut Governorate of Yemen on 12 June 2015.

Early life, Afghanistan and al-Qaeda
Nasir al-Wuyayshi was born on 1 October 1976 in the Mukayras region of what is now the southern province of Abyan, Yemen. He spent time in religious institutions in Yemen before travelling to Afghanistan in 1998 and joining al-Qaeda.

al-Wuhayshi served as secretary to Osama bin Laden for years in Afghanistan. He left Afghanistan in 2001 and was soon arrested by Iranian authorities, who handed him over to his native Yemen two years later where he was imprisoned without charges. Al-Wuhayshi became the leader of al-Qaeda's Yemeni operations after a previous leader was killed in a US Predator drone strike in 2002.

In February 2006, Nasir al-Wuhayshi was one of 23 Yemeni captives who escaped from custody from a maximum security prison in Sana'a.

His authority seemed to derive mostly from his long proximity to Osama bin Laden.

Foundation and Emir of AQAP
In January 2009, the al-Qaeda branches in Yemen and Saudi Arabia merged and formed al-Qaeda in the Arabian Peninsula (AQAP). Ayman Al-Zawahiri confirmed al-Wuhayshi's appointment as leader of AQAP in a video posted online.

Nasir al-Wuhayshi and three other men appeared in several threatening videos released in January 2009.  Al Wuhayshi published an additional video calling for violence in February.
He claimed the increase in western warships off the Horn of Africa to fight piracy were really intended to oppress Islam.
According to Yemeni military officials he was killed in southern Yemen on 28 August 2011. 
On 25 October 2011, AQAP denied that he was killed.

On 6 December, al-Wuhayshi released a statement on jihadist websites that AQAP would be intervening in the Siege of Dammaj on the side of Salafi students fighting the Shi'a Houthi militia.  A member of a local tribe reported on 22 December that Abdel al-Wuhashi, a younger brother of Nasir, was killed by Yemeni military forces.

In 2013, Al-Qaeda Emir Ayman al-Zawahiri appointed al-Wuhayshi as his deputy, speculating that he may be the next Emir of Al-Qaeda.

In March 2014, al-Wuhayshi made an appearance in a video celebrating the mass jailbreak of fighters held in Yemeni prisons. Around 400 AQAP fighters were present in what was described as being the largest known gathering of al-Qaeda in Yemen. In the video, al-Wuhayshi declared, "We have to remove the Cross, and the bearer of the Cross, America."

Death
Al-Wuhayshi was killed in a US drone strike in Yemen on 12 June 2015. AQAP released a statement acknowledging his death several days later and announced Qasim al-Raymi as his successor.

References

1976 births
2015 deaths
Assassinated al-Qaeda leaders
Deaths by United States drone strikes in Yemen
Fugitives
Individuals designated as terrorists by the United States government
Leaders of Islamic terror groups
Named on Saudi Arabia's list of most wanted suspected terrorists
People from Al Bayda Governorate
People killed in the Yemeni Civil War (2014–present)
Yemeni al-Qaeda members